Rabenstein Castle (German:Burg Rabenstein) is the smallest Medieval castle in Saxony. It is located in the Chemnitz suburb of Rabenstein and belongs to the Chemnitz Castle Hill Museum.

History
The hill castle Rabenstein was first mentioned in 1336 in a document from Louis IV, Holy Roman Emperor  in which he promised it as a fief to his son-in-law Frederick II, Margrave of Meissen, in case the line of Waldenburg were to die out without male heirs. 

At this time the castle was larger than the current.  The castle walls consisted of a 180 m long wall, which enclosed an area of two hectares. 

Castles in Saxony
Buildings and structures in Chemnitz
Tourist attractions in Chemnitz